The term Northern Power Station may refer to the following:
 Northern Power Station (South Australia), a power station in Australia.
 Northern Power Station (Sri Lanka), a power station in Sri Lanka.